The men's ice hockey tournament at the 1980 Winter Olympics in Lake Placid, United States, was the 14th Olympic Championship. Twelve teams competed in the tournament, which was held from February 12 to 24, 1980. The United States won its second gold medal, including a win over the heavily favored Soviet Union that became known as the   held at the Olympic Fieldhouse (8,000) and the Olympic Arena (2,500).

Format
The IIHF ceased running a championship in Olympic years. Nations that did not participate in the Lake Placid Olympics were invited to compete in the inaugural Thayer Tutt Trophy in Ljubljana, Yugoslavia.

Going into the games, the teams were ranked and divided into two groups. Teams were ranked based on performance during the 1979 World Ice Hockey Championships. Included were the eight teams in the 1979 top Championship Division (Pool "A") as well as the top four teams in the 1979, second-tier, "B" Pool tournament. While Poland finished 8th place in Pool A, the Netherlands, winners of Pool B, were ranked 8th while Poland was ranked 9th going into the Olympics. The total ranking was: Soviet Union (1), Czechoslovakia (2), Sweden (3), Canada (4), Finland (5), West Germany (6), United States (7), Netherlands (8), Poland (9), Romania (10), Norway (11), Japan (12).  East Germany was originally ranked tenth, but declined to participate, with Japan filling their spot.

Overview
The Soviet Union had won the gold medal in five of the six previous Winter Olympic Games, and were the favorites to win once more in Lake Placid. The team consisted primarily of professional players with significant experience in international play. By contrast, the United States' team—led by head coach Herb Brooks—consisted exclusively of amateur players, and was the youngest team in the tournament and in U.S. national team history. In the group stage, both the Soviet and U.S. teams were unbeaten; the U.S. achieved several notable results, including a 2–2 draw against Sweden, and a 7–3 upset victory over second-place favorites Czechoslovakia.

For the first game in the medal round, the United States played the Soviets. Finishing the first period tied at 2–2, and the Soviets leading 3–2 following the second, the U.S. team scored two more goals to take their first lead during the third and final period, winning the game 4–3. Following the game, the U.S. went on to clinch the gold medal by beating Finland in their last game. The Soviet Union took the silver medal by beating Sweden.

The victory became one of the most iconic moments of the Games and in U.S. sports. Equally well-known was the television call of the final seconds of the game by Al Michaels for ABC, in which he declared: "Do you believe in miracles?! YES!" In 1999, Sports Illustrated named the "Miracle on Ice" the top sports moment of the 20th century. As part of its centennial celebration in 2008, the International Ice Hockey Federation (IIHF) named the "Miracle on Ice" as the best international ice hockey story of the past 100 years.

Medalists

First round

Blue Division

All times are local (UTC–5).

Red Division

All times are local (UTC–5).

Consolation round
The third-placed teams in each division played each other to determine fifth place.

Final round

The top two teams from each group play the top two teams from the other group once. Points from previous games against their own group carry over, excluding teams who failed to make the medal round. First place team wins gold, second silver, and third bronze.

Head-to-head results carried forward from group matches:
February 12: Sweden 2–2 USA
February 18: Finland 2–4 USSR

Final round matches:

Statistics

Average age
Team Japan was the oldest team in the tournament, averaging 30 years. Gold medalists team USA was the youngest team in the tournament, averaging 22 years and 5 months. Silver medalists team USSR averaged 26 years and 5 months. Tournament average was 25 years and 5 months.

Leading scorers

Hat trick scorers

 (vs. Netherlands)
 (vs. West Germany)
 (vs. West Germany)
 (vs. Canada)
 (vs. West Germany)
 (vs. Poland)
 (vs. West Germany)
 (vs. Poland)
 (vs. Japan)
 (vs. Netherlands)
 (vs. Netherlands)
 (vs. Norway)

Leading goaltenders
Goaltenders with 40% or more of their team's total minutes.

Shutouts
  (vs. Japan)
  (vs. Norway)
  (vs. Romania)
  (vs. Japan)

Final ranking

 These standings are presented as the IIHF has them, however the IOC maintains that Poland and Romania tied for 7th, the Netherlands and West Germany tied for 9th, and Norway and Japan tied for 11th.

References

External links
Official Report
Washington Post article
Montreal Gazette article about the Dutch team

 
1980 Winter Olympics events
1980
1980 Winter Olympics
Oly